The 1926 United States Senate election in Louisiana was held on November 2, 1926. Incumbent Democratic Senator Edwin Broussard was elected to a second term in office.

On September 14, Broussard won the Democratic primary against Rep. Jared Sanders with 51.06% of the vote. 

At this time, Louisiana was a one-party state (no other party had run a candidate for Senate since the passage of the Seventeenth Amendment), and the Democratic nomination was tantamount to victory. Broussard won the November general election without an opponent.

Democratic primary

Candidates
Edwin S. Broussard, incumbent Senator
Jared Y. Sanders Sr., U.S. Representative from Franklin and former Governor of Louisiana

Results

General election

References

1926
Louisiana
United States Senate
Single-candidate elections